The Municipality of Brda is a municipality in western Slovenia. It is located in the Slovenian Littoral region, extending from the Italian border to the Soča River. It is bounded by Sabotin Hill to the east and Korada Hill to the north.

The people speak a distinctive Slovene dialect belonging to the Littoral dialect group.

Geography
The municipality comprises the Slovenian part of the Gorizia Hills, which are one of the most important wine-producing microregions in Slovenia. It enjoys a mild Mediterranean climate and it is protected from the strong Bora wind, which frequently blows in other parts of the Slovenian Littoral.

Settlements
In addition to the municipal seat of Dobrovo, the municipality also includes the following settlements:

 Barbana
 Belo
 Biljana
 Brdice pri Kožbani
 Brdice pri Neblem
 Breg pri Golem Brdu
 Brestje
 Brezovk
 Ceglo
 Dolnje Cerovo
 Drnovk
 Fojana
 Golo Brdo
 Gonjače
 Gornje Cerovo
 Gradno
 Hlevnik
 Hruševlje
 Hum
 Imenje
 Kojsko
 Kozana
 Kozarno
 Kožbana
 Krasno
 Medana
 Neblo
 Nozno
 Plešivo
 Podsabotin
 Pristavo
 Senik
 Slapnik
 Slavče
 Šlovrenc
 Šmartno
 Snežatno
 Snežeče
 Vedrijan
 Vipolže
 Višnjevik
 Vrhovlje pri Kojskem
 Vrhovlje pri Kožbani
 Zali Breg

Economy
Agriculture is an important part of the local economy: besides grapes, cherries are the most important agricultural product in the municipality, followed by apricots, pears, figs, and plums. Together with the Vipava Valley, Brda produces most of the persimmons in Slovenia. Small amounts of olive oil are also produced.

The wine varieties grown in Brda include Merlot, Cabernet Sauvignon, Pinot noir, Pinot gris, and Sauvignon vert.

Notable people
Brda is the native land of the poet Alojz Gradnik, who was born in the village of Medana.

See also
Slovenian wine
Collio Goriziano

References

External links

Municipality of Brda on Geopedia
 Municipality of Brda website
 About Goriska Brda

 
Brda
1994 establishments in Slovenia